Gogebic–Iron County Airport  is a county-owned public-use airport located seven nautical miles (13 km) northeast of the central business district of Ironwood, a city in Gogebic County, Michigan, United States. It is mostly used for general aviation, but it also offers scheduled passenger service which is subsidized by the Essential Air Service program.

The airport is included in the Federal Aviation Administration (FAA) National Plan of Integrated Airport Systems for 2021–2025, in which it is categorized as a non-primary commercial service facility.

The airport received $30,000 from the US Department of Transportation in 2020 as part of the CARES Act to help it mitigate the effects of the covid-19 pandemic.

Facilities and aircraft
In addition, the Ironwood VORTAC (IWD) navigational facility is located at the field.

The airport closed for 6 weeks in 2020 to perform major construction to the airport's single runway and passenger terminal. The existing surface was milled and a new blacktop applied. Lighting and wiring were placed, and the runway was repainted.

For the 12-month period ending June 29, 2022, the airport had 5,766 aircraft operations, an average of 16 per day: 62% general aviation, 30% scheduled commercial, 9% air taxi and less than 1% military. In November 2021, there were 19 aircraft based at this airport: 16 single-engine and 3 multi-engine.

The airport operates its own FBO, which offers fuel, a lounge and conference room, and courtesy cars.

Airline and destinations

Passenger

Cargo

Historical airline service 
Frontier Express provided service to Rhinelander (RHI), continuing on to Milwaukee (MKE) until March 8, 2012. Great Lakes Airlines began Minneapolis/St. Paul (MSP) service on March 17, 2012, but this was discontinued on January 31, 2014. On April 18, 2014, the DOT awarded a two-year contract to Air Choice One for service to and from Ironwood to Chicago, Illinois (ORD). Air Choice One began flights to Ironwood on July 7, 2014, and added Minneapolis service in 2016.

Boutique Air service began on August 1, 2020, with service to both Chicago and Minneapolis. Multiple incidents, including a tire falling off an aircraft and a cargo door opening in flight, led the airport board to seek a new air carrier. The board chose to recommend and the DOT approved Denver Air Connection to take over the contract. Service will be provided on the 50 seat Embraer E145.

Statistics

Accidents & Incidents
On August 14, 2000, a Rockwell Sabreliner 75A crashed into a wooded area northeast of the airport. The flight was enroute from Brainerd-Crow Wing County Airport to Flight/Bishop airport. The aircraft reported an emergency during an enroute climb due to a dual engine failure caused by a lightning strike. The aircraft was vectored near a level 5 thunderstorm while it attempted to divert to Ironwood. It was later found that, even though they attempted to restart the engines, the pilots never called for the aircraft's checklists, nor did they discuss load shedding any of the electrical components of the aircraft. The pilots lost their navigation at 17,500 feet msl and 12 miles from the airport and eventually crashed. The probable cause was found to be the pilots' continued flight into known adverse weather, their failure to turn on continuous ignition in turbulence, and the pilots' failure to follow the proper procedures for an inflight engine restart. The two pilots received fatal injuries, and two additional passengers onboard received serious injuries.
On April 23, 2003, a Maule M-5-210C ground looped and impacted terrain while attempting to land on Runway 27 at IWD. The pilot reported that the tail wheel "shimmied" when he attempted a three-point landing on touchdown, so he pushed forward on the yoke to lift the tail and then subsequently pulled back on the yoke. The pilot noticed he became unaligned with the runway and tried adding full power to go around, but he did not have enough airspeed to lift off before running off the side of the runway. The aircraft impacted a drainage ditch south of the runway. The probable cause of the accident was the pilot's inadvertent ground loop on the runway. The pilot and passenger were uninjured.
On December 28, 2004, a twin-engine Piper crashed while trying to land at Ironwood. Visibility was reportedly good. The pilot, his wife, and their three daughters were killed.
On June 2, 2017 a single-engine aircraft practicing landings at the airport narrowly avoided striking a fawn as it ran across the runway. The pilot veered to avoid the deer and damaged a wheel assembly on the plane. There were no injuries.
On August 3, 2019, a Piper PA-28 Cherokee originating from IWD crashed on route to Ontonagon County Airport due to flight into adverse weather.

References

Other sources 

 Essential Air Service documents (Docket Number DOT-OST-1996-1266) from the U.S. Department of Transportation:
 Order 2005-5-14 (May 23, 2005): selecting Skyway Airlines, Inc., d/b/a Midwest Connect, to provide essential air service at Iron Mountain/Kingsford, Michigan, Ironwood, Michigan/Ashland, Wisconsin, and Manistee/Ludington, Michigan, for a two-year period at annual subsidy rates of $602,761, $409,242, and $776,051, respectively ($1,788,054 in total).
 Order 2007-3-21 (March 30, 2007): selecting Great Lakes Aviation, Ltd. to provide subsidized essential air service at Iron Mountain/Kingsford, Michigan, Ironwood, Michigan/Ashland, Wisconsin, Manistee/Lundington, Michigan, and Escanaba, Michigan for the two-year period beginning when the carrier inaugurates full service. The annual subsidy rates will be set at: $797,885 for Iron Mountain/Kingsford, $799,779 for Ironwood/Ashland, $957,978 for Manistee/Ludington, and $617,415 for Escanaba.
 Order 2008-4-10 (April 7, 2008): selecting Great Lakes Aviation, Ltd., to provide subsidized essential air service (EAS) at Ironwood, Michigan/Ashland, Wisconsin, and Manistee/Ludington, Michigan, utilizing 19-seat Beech 1900D aircraft at a combined annual subsidy rate of $3,292,260, for a new two-year term beginning when it inaugurates full service.
 Order 2011-1-16 (January 18, 2011): selecting Chautauqua Airlines, Inc. d/b/a Frontier Airlines, a wholly owned subsidiary of Republic Airways Holdings, Inc., to provide subsidized essential air service (EAS) at Ironwood, Michigan/Ashland, Wisconsin (Ironwood), and Manistee/Ludington, Michigan (Manistee). Service will be provided with 37-seat Embraer 135 aircraft for a two-year period beginning when the carrier inaugurates service through the end of the 24th month thereafter, at a combined annual subsidy rate of $3,082,383.
 Order 2012-3-5 (March 7, 2012): selecting Great Lakes Aviation, Ltd. to provide subsidized Essential Air Service (EAS) at Ironwood, Michigan/Ashland, Wisconsin, and Rhinelander, Wisconsin, for a two-year period beginning when the carrier inaugurates full EAS at both communities through the end of the 24th month thereafter. Great Lakes, utilizing 19-seat Beech 1900D aircraft, will require annual subsidies of $1,410,250 for Rhinelander and $1,747,326 for Ironwood/Ashland. Chautauqua will continue to utilize 37-seat or substitute 50-seat jet aircraft for a short-term annual subsidy rate of $1,837,638.
 Order 2012-9-17 (September 14, 2012): establishing the Essential Air Service (EAS) contract end date at Ironwood, Michigan/Ashland, Wisconsin, as May 31, 2014.
 Order 2014-4-17 (April 18, 2014): selecting Multi-Aero, Inc. d/b/a Air Choice One, to provide Essential Air Service (EAS) at Ironwood, Michigan/Ashland, Wisconsin, using 9-passenger Cessna Grand Caravan or 8-passenger Piper Navajo aircraft to Chicago O'Hare International Airport for 3 round trips each weekday and weekend (18 total per week), for the two-year term from June 1, 2014, through May 31, 2016, for an annual subsidy of $3,563,394.

External links 
 Gogebic–Iron County Airport, official site
   from Michigan Airport Directory
   from Wisconsin Airport Directory
 Aerial image as of May 1998 from USGS The National Map
 

Airports in Michigan
Essential Air Service
Buildings and structures in Gogebic County, Michigan
Transportation in Gogebic County, Michigan
Airports in the Upper Peninsula of Michigan